Potassium pyrosulfate, or potassium disulfate, is an inorganic compound with the chemical formula K2S2O7.

Production
Potassium pyrosulfate is obtained by the thermal decomposition of other salts, most directly from potassium bisulfate:
 2 KHSO4 → K2S2O7 + H2O
Temperatures above 600°C further decompose potassium pyrosulfate to potassium sulfate and sulfur trioxide however:
 K2S2O7 → K2SO4 + SO3

Other salts, such as potassium trisulfate, can also decompose into potassium pyrosulfate.

Chemical structure
Potassium pyrosulfate contains the pyrosulfate anion which has a dichromate-like structure. The geometry can be visualized as a tetrahedron with two corners sharing the SO4 anion's configuration and a centrally bridged oxygen atom. A semi-structural formula for the pyrosulfate anion is O3SOSO32−. The oxidation state of sulfur in this compound is +6.

Uses
Potassium pyrosulfate is used in analytical chemistry; samples are fused with potassium pyrosulfate, (or a mixture of potassium pyrosulfate and potassium fluoride) to ensure complete dissolution prior to a quantitative analysis.

The compound is also present in a catalyst in conjunction with vanadium(V) oxide in the industrial production of sulfur trioxide.

See also
 Sodium pyrosulfate

References

Potassium compounds
Pyrosulfates